Lughaidh Ó Cléirigh (fl. 1603 – 1616), sometimes anglicised as Lewey O'Clery, was an Irish Gaelic poet and historian. He is best known today as the author of Beatha Aodha Ruaidh Uí Dhomhnaill, a biography of Red Hugh O'Donnell.

Life
Born in Tír Conaill (modern-day County Donegal), Lughaidh was the cousin of renowned Gaelic historian Mícheál Ó Cléirigh and one of five sons of Maccon Ó Cléirigh, a court poet to the O'Donnells. The Ó Cléirighs had a long tradition as one of Gaelic Ireland's foremost learned families, and the Tír Conaill branch had served the O'Donnells for over two hundred years. Lughaidh and his brothers are the last generation of their sept to be included in the Ó Cléirigh genealogies of the 17th-century.

In the lead up to the Ulster Plantation, he was involved as a juror and commissioner in the land surveys in Donegal. Lughaidh  participated in the Contention of the bards, an event which probably took place between 1616 and 1624. Of the thirty poems produced by the participants, four were reportedly written by Ó Cléirigh. The 19th-century historian John O'Donovan believed that Lughaidh Ó Cléirigh was the father of the annalist Cucoigriche (Peregrine) Ó Cléirigh, but this has since been disputed. The date of Lughaidh Ó Cléirigh's death is unknown.

Beatha Aodha Ruaidh Uí Dhomhnaill
Ó Cléirigh is best known as the author of Beatha Aodha Ruaidh Uí Dhomhnaill (Life of Red Hugh O'Donnell), a biography of Red Hugh, a leader in the Nine Years' War. The work was a major source for the account of the period given in the Annals of the Four Masters and is the fullest contemporary source for O'Donnell's life and career. Lughaidh's work is identified in the Annals merely as the book of Lughaidh Ó Cléirigh. The vagueness of the description led many early scholars to conclude that Cucoigriche Ó Cléirigh had authored the work. In his 1851 edition of the Annals O'Donovan cited  Cucoigriche as the author of the Beatha, believing it to be a different text to the work attributed to Lughaidh by the annalists. Eugene O'Curry was the first to attribute the Beatha to Lughaidh, suggesting that Cucoigriche was merely the scribe.

Beatha Aodha Ruaidh Uí Dhomhnaill is composed in ornate and archaic form of Irish. Unsurprisingly it has a strong Donegal bias. The text survives in one contemporary manuscript,  Dublin, Royal Irish Academy MS 23 P 24, written in the hand of Cucoigriche Ó Cléirigh. The work was first edited and translated by Denis Murphy in 1895. A fuller Irish Texts Society edition by Paul Walsh was published in two volumes in 1948 and 1957.

See also
 Peregrine Ó Duibhgeannain
 Mícheál Ó Cléirigh
 John O'Donovan (scholar)

References

External links
 Catalogue description and digital images of the manuscript at Irish Script on Screen
 Walsh's edition of Beatha Aodha Ruaidh Uí Dhomhnaill online at CELT

17th-century Irish historians
People of Elizabethan Ireland
People from County Donegal
Irish-language poets
Irish chroniclers
Irish scribes